Saed Soheili (born February 19, 1988) is an Iranian actor. He is best known for his acting in Guidance Patrol (2012), A Few Cubic Meters of Love (2014), Crazy Rook (2014) and Lottery (2018).

Early life 
Soheili was born in Mashhad, the son of Iranian director Saeed Soheili. His brother Sina, and his two sisters, Sara and Saba, are active in the field of cinema, television and theater. Soheili began his work at age 14 with a short role in Shab-e Brehne, directed by his father. He was also behind the scenes in some of his father's work. He has a bachelor of graphic art from the Islamic Azad University.

His first professional role was in a play for a television film by Javad Ezzati.

Soheili is married to Gloria Hardy, a French actress who appeared in the Kimia series.

Saed Soheili was refused entry by the UAE government following the release of Lottery at the 36th Fajr Film Festival.

Filmography

Film

Web

Television

Awards and nominations

References

External links 

 
 

1988 births
Living people
People from Mashhad
Iranian male film actors
Iranian male television actors
21st-century Iranian male actors